The 2004 Scottish League Cup final was played on 14 March 2004, at Hampden Park in Glasgow and was the final of the 57th Scottish League Cup. The final was contested by Hibernian and Livingston. Livingston won the match 2–0, thanks to goals from Derek Lilley and Jamie McAllister.

Livingston entered administration a few weeks before the final, with the players being informed the day before they won their semi-final match against Dundee. Six players left the club immediately, but the first team squad was largely left intact ahead of the final.

It was the first time since Hearts' 2–1 win over Rangers in the 1998 Scottish Cup Final that a team other than the Old Firm had won a trophy in Scotland, and the first time the feat had been achieved in the League Cup since 1995 when Aberdeen beat Dundee 2–0.

Match details

References

2004
League Cup Final
Hibernian F.C. matches
Livingston F.C. matches
2000s in Glasgow